Tarin Bradford (born 22 May 1980) is an Australian former rugby league footballer who played for the North Queensland Cowboys and Manly Warringah Sea Eagles in the National Rugby League.

Playing career
A Burdekin Roosters junior, Bradford joined the North Queensland Cowboys in 2001.

In Round 4 of the 2001 NRL season, he made his NRL debut in the Cowboys' 18–32 loss to the Penrith Panthers. He played just one more game in 2001 and three in 2002, scoring two tries. In May 2002, Bradford was granted a release from the club, citing personal problems. He later returned to play for the Burdekin Roosters A-Grade side.

Statistics

NRL
 Statistics are correct to the end of the 2002 season

References

1980 births
Living people
Australian rugby league players
North Queensland Cowboys players
Rugby league players from Queensland
Rugby league wingers